Mysore Srikantayya Umesh, popularly known as M. S. Umesh or simply Umesh, is an Indian actor whose Kannada cinema career has spanned six decades. After having featured in several stage shows as an actor in his childhood, he was hired for the lead character in the film Makkala Rajya (1960). Since then, he has acted in over 350 feature films renowned for his unique dialogue delivery, facial expressions and comedy timing.

Early life and family
Umesh was born on 24 April 1945 to A. L. Srikantayya and Nanjamma. His basic schooling was in Mysore where he was drawn towards theater and stage performances. At the age of 4, he joined the popular theater troupe run by K. Hirannaiah. Soon he joined the more famous Gubbi Veeranna's company and performed various roles as a child artist. It was in one of such stage plays that the then assistant director Puttanna Kanagal noticed him and recommended his name to B. R. Panthulu's next film.

Umesh's first appearance as an actor on the silver screen was with Makkala Rajya in 1960 directed by veteran actor-director B. R. Panthulu for his Padmini films banner. This was also the second film produced by M. V. Rajamma. This film also featured veteran Tamil actor Sivaji Ganesan in a cameo role.

Career
Post the superhit debut film, Umesh who was 15, could no longer feature in child roles and adult roles either. He moved back to stage shows and took up jobs which included some back stage labor works. He struggled to find himself a good role in drama plays too. It was then that Puttanna Kanagal again came to his rescue and cast him in his anthology film Katha Sangama (1977). His portrayal as "Thimmarayi" in the Munithaayi episode featuring Rajinikanth and Aarathi fetched him multiple laurels including the Karnataka State Film Award for Best Supporting Actor. Starting from here, Umesh was cast in a series of films from 1980's through 2000's. Some of his best remembered films include Nagara Hole (1978), Guru Shishyaru (1981), Anupama (1981), Kaamana Billu (1983), Apoorva Sangama (1984), Shruthi Seridaaga (1987), Shravana Banthu (1984), Malaya Marutha (1986), Golmaal Radhakrishna (1990), Neenu Nakkare Haalu Sakkare (1993), Venkata in Sankata (2007) to name a few.

Umesh's comedy role as "Sithapathi" in the 1990 comedy film, Golmaal Radhakrishna starring Ananth Nag in the lead is considered one of the best comedy roles in Kannada cinema. His catchy dialogue "Apaartha Madkondbitro Eno" is widely acclaimed among the masses. His role as an old toothless widow grandmother in Ramesh Aravind's directorial Venkata in Sankata was also widely appreciated.

Selected filmography 

 Makkala Rajya (1960)
 Katha Sangama (1976)...Thimmaraya
 Nagara Hole (1977)
 Bhagyavantharu (1977)
 Savalige Saval (1978)
 Vasantha Lakshmi (1978)
 Thappida Thala (1978)
 Kiladi Jodi (1978)
 Putani Agent 123 (1979)
 Mutthu Ondu Mutthu (1979)
 Prema Anuraga (1980)
 Haavina Hede (1981)
 Guru Shishyaru (1981)
 Bhoomige Banda Bhagavantha (1981)
 Bangarada Mane (1981)
 Anupama (1981)
 Antha (1981)
 Suvarna Sethuve (1982)
 Prema Mathsara (1982)
 Nanna Devaru (1982)
 Haalu Jenu (1982)
 Simha Garjane (1983)
 Kalluveene Nudiyithu (1983)
 Kaamana Billu (1983)
 Ibbani Karagithu (1983)
 Hasida Hebbuli (1983)
 Gandharva Giri (1983)
 Eradu Nakshatragalu (1983)
 Bhakta Prahlada (1983)
 Avala Neralu (1983)
 Pralayanthaka (1984)
 Prachanda Kulla (1984)
 Gandu Bherunda (1984)
 Shravana Banthu (1984)
 Benki Birugali (1984)
 Apoorva Sangama (1984)
 Malaya Marutha (1986)
 Shruthi Seridaaga (1987)
 Challenge Gopalakrishna (1990)
 Golmaal Radhakrishna (1990)
 Rani Maharani (1990)
 Raja Kempu Roja (1990)
 Policena Hendthi (1990)
 Neenu Nakkare Haalu Sakkare (1991)
 Gauri Ganesha (1991)
 Kollur Kala (1991)
 Hatyakanda (1991)
 Banni Ondsala Nodi (1992)
 Ksheera Sagara (1992)
 Megha Mandara (1992)
 Sahasi (1992)
 Kaliyuga Seethe (1992)
 Prema Sangama (1992)
 Tharle Nan Maga (1992)
 Sapthapadi (1992)
 Ondu Cinema Kathe (1992)
 Belliyappa Bangarappa (1992)
 Mallige Hoove (1992)
 Akasmika (1993)...Sridhar
 Server Somanna (1993)
 Kalyana Rekhe (1993)
 Time Bomb (1994)
 Hello Sister (1995)
 Himapatha (1995)
 Geluvina Saradara (1996)
 Nannaseya Hoove (1999)
 Hagalu Vesha (2000)
 Sundara Purusha (2000)
 Jokefalls (2004)
 Pandu Ranga Vittala (2005)
 Seven O' Clock (2006)
 Savira Mettilu (2006)
 Sajni (2007)
 Ganesha Matthe Banda (2008)
 Mussanjemaatu (2008)
 Venkata in Sankata (2009)
 Crazy Kutumba (2010)
 Aithalakkadi (2010)
 Jackie (2010)
 Mathond Madhuvena (2011)
 Gun (2011)
 Rambo (2012)
 Lucky (2012)
 Chellapilli (2013)
 Navarangi (2014)
 Gandhiji Kanasu (2014)
 Pungi Daasa (2014)
 Siddhartha (2015)
 Ond Chance Kodi (2015)
 Charlie (2015)
 Mumtaz (movie) 
 CBI Sathya (2016)
 Mahaveera Machideva (2016)
 Thale Bachkolli Powder Hakkolli (2016)
 Badmaash (2016)
 No Entry (2016)
 John Jani Janardhan (2016)
 Sri Omkara Ayyappane (2016)
 Bhootayyana Mommaga Ayyu (2018)

Awards
 1975 - Karnataka State Film Award for Best Supporting Actor - Katha Sangama
 2013 - Karnataka Nataka Akademy Award - for his contribution to the professional theatre.

References

External links

1945 births
Male actors from Mysore
Indian male comedians
Kannada male actors
Male actors in Kannada cinema
Indian male film actors
Living people
Film producers from Karnataka
20th-century Indian male actors
Kannada film producers
Kannada film directors
Film directors from Karnataka
Recipients of the Rajyotsava Award 2010